Lisa Schoeneberg (born September 29, 1957) is an American curler and Olympian. She was a successful skip in the late 1980s and throughout the 1990s, leading her teams to two silver medals at the World Championships and represented the United States at the Olympic Games twice.

Curling career 
In 1987 Schoeneberg and her team of Carla Casper, Lori Mountford, and Erika Brown competed at the United States' first Olympic Curling Trials, as curling was reintroduced at the 1988 Winter Olympics as a demonstration event. They upset the top two teams from that year's national championship to win the Trials and earn their spot as the American women's team at the Olympics. At the Games they finished 5th out of 8 teams, with a 4-4 record.

Also in 1988, Schoeneberg played as vice-skip for Steve Brown when they won the United States Mixed Curling Championship.

Schoeneberg made her first appearance at the World Championships in 1990 in Västerås when she joined Bev Behnke's team, who had won the US National Championship, as alternate. They finished in 8th with a record of 3-7.

Three times in the next six years Schoeneberg returned to the World Championships, but as skip instead of alternate. In 1992, 1995, and 1996 Schoeneberg led her team to the gold medal at the US National Championships and on to represent the United States at World's. At the 1992 World Championship in Garmisch-Partenkirchen the American women lost to Team Sweden in the championship game, resulting in a silver medal. At the 1995 World Championship in Brandon they missed the playoffs, finished tied for 5th with a 4-5 record. At the 1996 World Championship in Hamilton Schoeneberg's team again found success, making it to the championship game for a second time. This time they lost to Team Canada, again claiming the silver medal.

Schoeneberg returned to the Olympics as skip at the 1998 Winter Games in Nagano, where curling made its debut as a full event. The American team achieved 2 wins and 5 losses in the round-robin tournament, finishing tied for 5th place.

Schoeneberg was inducted into the United States Curling Association (USCA) Hall of Fame in 2006 and four times she has been named the USCA Female Athlete of the Year: in 1987, 1992, 1995, and 1996.

Teams

Women's

Mixed

References

External links 

1957 births
Living people
American female curlers
Olympic curlers of the United States
Curlers at the 1998 Winter Olympics
American curling champions
Curlers at the 1988 Winter Olympics
21st-century American women